Seth Morrison may refer to:

 Seth Morrison (skier) (born 1973), American skier
 Seth Morrison (musician) (born 1988), American musician